Paul Edward Valentine Giamatti (born June 6, 1967) is an American actor, comedian and film producer. He first garnered attention for his breakout role in Private Parts as Kenny "Pig Vomit" Rushton, leading to supporting roles in Saving Private Ryan, Man on the Moon, Big Momma's House, and Big Fat Liar.

He played the titular character in the HBO miniseries John Adams (2008), which earned him a Golden Globe Award, a Primetime Emmy Award and Screen Actors Guild Award. He stars as U.S. Attorney Chuck Rhoades Jr. in the Showtime television series Billions (2016–present).

Early life
Giamatti was born June 6, 1967, in New Haven, Connecticut, the youngest of three children. His father, Angelo Bartlett Giamatti, was a Yale University professor who later became president of the university and commissioner of Major League Baseball. His mother, Toni Marilyn Giamatti (née Smith), was a homemaker and English teacher who taught at Hopkins School and had also previously acted.

His paternal grandfather's family were Italian emigrants from Telese Terme; the family surname was originally spelled "Giammattei" before immigrating to the United States. Giamatti's other ancestries are German, Dutch, English, French, Irish, and Scottish. His paternal grandmother had deep roots in New England, dating back to the colonial era. Giamatti's brother, Marcus, is also an actor, and his sister, Elena, is a jewelry designer.

Giamatti was first educated at The Foote School and later graduated from Choate Rosemary Hall in 1985. He attended Yale, where he was active in the undergraduate theater scene and working with fellow actors and Yale students Ron Livingston and Edward Norton. He graduated in 1989 with a bachelor's degree in English, and went on to earn a Master of Fine Arts degree from the Yale School of Drama, where he studied with Earle R. Gister. He performed in numerous theatrical productions, including on Broadway and a stint from 1989 to 1992 with Seattle's Annex Theater, before appearing in some small television and film roles in the early 1990s.

Career

In 1997, Giamatti landed his first high-profile role as Kenny "Pig Vomit" Rushton in the film adaptation of Howard Stern's Private Parts. Stern praised Giamatti's performance often on his radio program, calling for him to be nominated for the Academy Award for Best Supporting Actor. In 1998, Giamatti appeared in a number of supporting roles in the big-budget films, The Truman Show, Saving Private Ryan and The Negotiator. In 1999, he played Bob Zmuda and Tony Clifton in Miloš Forman's Andy Kaufman biopic, Man on the Moon. Giamatti continued working steadily during the early 2000s by appearing in major studio releases including Big Momma's House, Planet of the Apes and Big Fat Liar.

In 2003, Giamatti began to earn critical acclaim after his lead role in the film American Splendor. In 2004, Giamatti gained mainstream recognition and fame with the independent romantic comedy Sideways. His portrayal of a depressed writer vacationing in the Santa Barbara wine country garnered him a Golden Globe nomination and an Independent Spirit Award and he was named Best Actor in a Leading Role by several significant film critics groups (New York, Chicago, Toronto, San Francisco, Online Film Critics).

Following the commercial success of Sideways, Giamatti appeared in Cinderella Man, for which he earned an Academy Award nomination for Best Supporting Actor. He was nominated for a Golden Globe and won the Screen Actors Guild Award for Best Supporting Actor - Motion Picture. In 2006, Giamatti was the lead in M. Night Shyamalan's Lady in the Water, a supernatural thriller, followed by the animated film The Ant Bully, and Neil Burger's drama The Illusionist co-starring Edward Norton.

Giamatti had his first major role in an action movie in the 2007 film Shoot 'Em Up, while also starring in The Nanny Diaries and Fred Claus. In 2008, Giamatti received an Emmy Award for Outstanding Lead Actor in a Miniseries or a Movie for his title performance in the 2008 HBO miniseries John Adams, as well as his first Golden Globe Award for Best Actor - Miniseries or Television Film, and also earned a Screen Actors Guild award. That same year, he starred in the independent film Pretty Bird, which is a fictionalized retelling about the drama behind the invention of a rocketbelt.

Giamatti received his second Golden Globe win for Best Actor in a Motion Picture - Musical or Comedy for his role in the 2010 film, Barney's Version. Giamatti starred as the lead in the comedy-drama film Win Win, which earned positive reviews from critics. The same year he had small roles in Ironclad, The Hangover Part II and The Ides of March.

In 2012, Giamatti became the voiceover actor for Liberty Mutual insurance commercials. He was the narrator for the PBS Nature episode An Original DUCKumentary. Giamatti produced and starred in John Dies at the End, which is based on the book of the same name. He also had roles in the films Rock of Ages and Cosmopolis.

In 2013, Giamatti returned to his alma mater, Yale University, to perform the title role in Shakespeare's Hamlet, for which he won rave reviews in a sold-out, modern dress stage production of the play at the Yale Repertory Theatre, in New Haven. He also had supporting roles in several films, including the animated Turbo and The Congress, as well as Parkland, Saving Mr. Banks, and the critically acclaimed 12 Years a Slave. In addition, Giamatti played the role of New Yorker Harold Levinson, the brother of Cora, the Countess of Grantham (Elizabeth McGovern), in the 2013 Christmas special of the period drama, ITV Studios/Carnival Films television series, Downton Abbey.

In 2014, Giamatti played villain The Rhino in The Amazing Spider-Man 2. Also in 2014, Giamatti portrayed psychologist Eugene Landy in the Brian Wilson biopic Love & Mercy. In 2015, Giamatti portrayed N.W.A manager Jerry Heller in the biographical drama Straight Outta Compton. He also played a scientist in the disaster film San Andreas.

In 2016, Giamatti began appearing in commercials for Prism TV, the IPTV service owned by CenturyLink; the spots are the first-ever on-camera TV commercial appearances for Giamatti. In 2022, Giamatti appeared as Scrooge and Einstein in Verizon commercials.
  
Giamatti plays a lead role in the Showtime series Billions, portraying the U.S. Attorney for the Southern District of New York. The show, debuting in 2016, is loosely based on a real event.

Wax Paul Now campaign
Giamatti is the subject of the viral "Wax Paul Now" campaign, which pushes for the actor to get a Madame Tussauds wax statue in his likeness. The movement first achieved national prominence when Giamatti appeared on The Late Show with Stephen Colbert and discussed the campaign with host Stephen Colbert. After this and subsequent articles in Forbes, BuzzFeed, and The A.V. Club among others, Madame Tussauds New York announced that they would host a party in Giamatti's honor to coincide with the premiere of Billions Season 3 on March 25, 2018, at which the founders of the Wax Paul Now movement would speak.

Tussauds announced that if a Change.org petition garnered 500,000 signatures in the nine days leading up to the party, they would agree to create the wax statue of Giamatti. As the petition was unable to garner enough signatures in time, the Wax Paul Now campaign is still ongoing. A short film chronicling the campaign premiered at the Virginia Film Festival in October 2019.

Personal life
Giamatti resides in the Brooklyn Heights neighborhood of Brooklyn, New York and was married to Elizabeth Cohen from 1997 to an undisclosed date in the 2000s. Though not religious, he stated: "My wife is Jewish. And I'm fine with my son being raised as a Jew".

Giamatti is an atheist, although for him "religion features more now in my life than it did when I was a kid".

Filmography

Film

Television

Theatre

Video games

Audiobooks

Awards and nominations

References

External links

Paul Giamatti: 'I'm clearly not Brad Pitt,' The Guardian, Oliver Burkeman, November 12, 2009

1967 births
Living people
People from Brooklyn Heights
20th-century American male actors
21st-century American male actors
American atheists
American male film actors
American male stage actors
American male television actors
American people of Dutch descent
American people of English descent
American people of French descent
American people of German descent
American people of Irish descent
American people of Italian descent
American people of Scottish descent
Best Miniseries or Television Movie Actor Golden Globe winners
Best Musical or Comedy Actor Golden Globe (film) winners
Choate Rosemary Hall alumni
Independent Spirit Award for Best Male Lead winners
Male actors from New Haven, Connecticut
Male actors from New York City
New York (state) Democrats
Outstanding Performance by a Cast in a Motion Picture Screen Actors Guild Award winners
Outstanding Performance by a Lead Actor in a Miniseries or Movie Primetime Emmy Award winners
Outstanding Performance by a Male Actor in a Miniseries or Television Movie Screen Actors Guild Award winners
Outstanding Performance by a Male Actor in a Supporting Role Screen Actors Guild Award winners
Yale School of Drama alumni
Best Actor Genie and Canadian Screen Award winners
Alumni of the British American Drama Academy